C4 was a Macintosh software developers conference held in Chicago, Illinois. The conference ran from 2006 through 2009. It was created by Jonathan Rentzsch after the demise of MacHack. In May 2010 Rentzsch announced that he would no longer operate the conference due to a dissatisfaction with Apple's policies toward iPhone OS development and the lack of a strong negative reaction from the Apple developer community.

Etymology
The name C4 stands for Code Culture Conspiracy Conference

C4[0]
The first C4 conference was a two-day event held at the University Center in downtown Chicago. It was held on October 20 and October 21, 2006, with an optional trip to Adler Planetarium's TimeSpace show for attendees on October 22. Due to that year's Chicago Marathon, attendees unable to stay downtown were provided free passes to the Chicago 'L' railway system for the weekend (an arrangement referred to as "Plan 'L'").

Presenters
Steve Dekorte, software developer
Drunkenbatman, blogger, organizer of Evening@Adler (held at Adler Planetarium)
Brian W. Fitzpatrick, developer of Subversion, Fire and Apache Portable Runtime
John Gruber, coauthor of Markdown and influential blogger (see Daring Fireball)
Gus Mueller, creator of VoodooPad
Jonathan Rentzsch, software developer
Brent Simmons, creator of NetNewsWire
Aaron Hillegass, software developer and Cocoa instructor at Big Nerd Ranch
Paul Kafasis, software developer and founder of Rogue Amoeba

Notable attendees
James Duncan Davidson, former Sun Microsystems engineer, creator of Tomcat and Ant

C4[1]
The second C4 conference was held at the Chicago City Centre Hotel on August 10–August 12, 2007. Like the first conference, C4[1] was organized by Jonathan Rentzsch.

Presenters
Tim Burks, RubyObjC developer
Drunkenbatman
Adam Engst, publisher of TidBITS
Bob Ippolito, PyObjC developer
Daniel Jalkut, developer of MarsEdit (acquired from Brent Simmons)
Jonathan Rentzch
Cabel Sasser, co-founder of Panic Inc.
Wil Shipley, creator of Delicious Library
Shawn Morel, VMware developer working on Fusion

Daniel Lyons, senior editor at Forbes magazine and writer of The Secret Diary of Steve Jobs under the pseudonym "Fake Steve Jobs", was scheduled to speak at C4 but was unable due to an illness.

C4[2]
The third C4 conference was held at the Chicago City Centre Hotel on September 5–September 7, 2008. Like the previous conferences, C4[2] was organized by Jonathan Rentzsch. He announced the conference via Twitter feed on April 23, 2008.

Presenters
 Alex Payne, developer for Twitter
 Brent Simmons, creator of NetNewsWire
 Buzz Andersen, creator of PodWorks
 Craig Hockenberry, creator of Twitterrific
 Mike Lee, former developer for Delicious Monster and Tapulous
 Rich Siegel, founder of Bare Bones Software
 D. Richard Hipp, architect and primary author of SQLite
 Wil Shipley, founder of Delicious Monster

C4[3]

The fourth C4 conference was held at the DoubleTree Chicago from September 25 to September 27, 2009. It sold out within eight hours of the initial announcement. This year's version featured Blitz talks, talks held between the conference's standard presentations.  In these talks, speakers were held to 5 minutes per presentation, with each slide having a maximum of 20 seconds on screen.

Presenters
 Augie Fackler, Google engineer
 Christopher Lloyd, creator of Cocotron
 Dave Dribin, founder of BitMaki
 John C. Welch
 Jonathan Rentzsch
 Matt Drance
 Michael Lopp, author of Rands in Repose
 Peter Wayner
 Patrick Thomson

References

External links
C4[0] schedule
Jonathan Rentzsch's blog posts about C4
Photos of C4 by attendee James Duncan Davidson at Flickr
Photos of C4 by presenter John Gruber at Flickr

Apple Inc. conferences